Sárvári Futball Club is a professional football club based in Sárvár, Vas County, Hungary, that competes in the Nemzeti Bajnokság III, the third tier of Hungarian football.

Name changes
1997–00: Sárvári Futball Club
2000: merger with Sárvári Vasas
2000–01: no teams competed
2001–present: Sárvári Futball Club

External links
 Official website of Sárvári FC
 Profile on Magyar Futball

References

Football clubs in Hungary
Association football clubs established in 1997
1997 establishments in Hungary